Gianmarco is an Italian masculine given name. Its English equivalent is "John Mark" and it is short for "Giovanni Marco".

It may refer to:

Gianmarco Bellini- Italian Air Force officer
Gianmarco Cavagnino- Italian architect
Gianmarco Pozzecco- Italian basketball player
Gian Marco Zignago- Peruvian musician
Gianmarco Zigoni- Italian footballer

Italian masculine given names